Henry Skeffington, 3rd Earl of Massereene (1744–2 June 1811) was an Anglo-Irish British Army officer, politician and peer.

Massereene was the second son of Clotworthy Skeffington, 1st Earl of Massereene and Anne Eyre. He was educated at Harrow School and Trinity College Dublin.

He sat in Irish House of Commons as the Member of Parliament for Belfast between 1768 and 1797. He then represented Antrim Borough from 1779 until the constituency disenfranchisement under the Acts of Union 1800.

Massereene gained the rank of lieutenant-colonel in the 2nd Regiment of Horse. He was Governor of Cork between 1792 and 1811.

He succeeded his brother, Clotworthy, as Earl of Massereene on 28 February 1805. Massereene never married and was succeeded in his title by his younger brother, Chichester.

References

1744 births
1811 deaths
Alumni of Trinity College Dublin
18th-century Anglo-Irish people
Irish MPs 1769–1776
Irish MPs 1776–1783
Irish MPs 1783–1790
Irish MPs 1790–1797
Irish MPs 1798–1800
People educated at Harrow School
Earls of Massereene